The 1954–55 Detroit Red Wings season saw the Red Wings finish first overall in the National Hockey League (NHL) with a record of 42 wins, 17 losses, and 11 ties for 95 points. They swept the Toronto Maple Leafs in the semi-finals and then won the Stanley Cup by defeating the Montreal Canadiens in a seven-game Stanley Cup Final. The Red Wings would not win another Stanley Cup until 1997.

Offseason

Regular season

Final standings

Record vs. opponents

Schedule and results

Player statistics

Forwards
Note: GP = Games played; G = Goals; A = Assists; Pts = Points; PIM = Penalty minutes

Defencemen
Note: GP = Games played; G = Goals; A = Assists; Pts = Points; PIM = Penalty minutes

Goaltending
Note: GP = Games played; W = Wins; L = Losses; T = Ties; SO = Shutouts; GAA = Goals against average

Playoffs

Stanley Cup Final

Detroit wins best-of-seven series 4 games to 3

Awards and records
 Prince of Wales Trophy: Detroit Red Wings
 Vezina Trophy: Terry Sawchuk, Detroit Red Wings
 Bob Goldham, Defence, NHL Second Team All-Star
 Red Kelly, Defence, NHL First Team All-Star
 Terry Sawchuk, Goaltender, NHL Second Team All-Star

References
 Red Wings on Hockey Database

Detroit
Detroit
Detroit Red Wings seasons
Stanley Cup championship seasons
Detroit Red Wings
Detroit Red Wings